Teruel Existe (TE) is a Spanish political party based in the province of Teruel. It was founded in November 1999 as a citizen platform with the goal of demanding a fair and equal treatment for the province of Teruel. In 1999, Teruel still had no motorways, and on the only railway line (which was single-track without electrification) the train had derailed eight times in a year.

Encouraged by the success of the strike called for 4 October 2019 in twenty Spanish provinces, to protest the "forgetfulness" suffered by the so-called "empty Spain", the platform chose to establish itself as a grouping of electors to contest the upcoming November general election in the province. It became the most voted provincial force, securing one out of the three Teruel Congress seats and two out of its four directly-elected senators, as well as becoming the first grouping of electors since the Spanish transition to democracy to be successful in entering the Spanish parliament.

The platform was instrumental in the investiture of Pedro Sánchez as Prime Minister of Spain on 5–7 January 2020, for whose support its leader Tomás Guitarte received intense threats and coercion from right-wing to far-right groups, which resulted in the Ministry of the Interior having to provide him of a policial escort for security reasons.

The platform was registered as a political party on 29 September 2021.

Electoral performance

Cortes Generales

References

1999 establishments in Spain
Political parties established in 1999
Political parties in Aragon
Regionalist parties in Spain